Special Moves is a live album by Scottish post-rock band Mogwai, released on 23 August 2010 through Rock Action Records.  Some of the formats in which the album was sold included a live performance documentary entitled Burning, recorded at the same live shows.

Recording 
The album was recorded at The Music Hall of Williamsburg, Brooklyn, New York over three performances from April 27–29, 2009.

Formats available 
The basic format for the album is a CD/Double-LP containing 11 tracks.  The album is also available as a limited edition triple vinyl LP box set containing an additional six tracks.  For a limited period only, those buying the CD/Double-LP version directly from the Mogwai online store, received a code to use to download the additional six tracks in MP3 format.  The extended CD/DVD set also includes the Burning DVD, as does the box set.

Reception

Reception was generally positive, with particular praise for the Burning video.  Noel Gardner of the BBC said the album had "the ability to make you jump out of your skin" whilst Mojo said the album was "a fittingly monolithic monument to (the band's) work to date". Review aggregator website AnyDecentMusic? correlated 11 reviews resulting in an ADM Rating of 7.9. What Hi-Fi? said it was one of the best live albums.

Personnel and credits

Mogwai
 Dominic Aitchison – bass guitar
 Stuart Braithwaite – guitar
 Martin Bulloch – drums
 Barry Burns – guitar and keyboard
 John Cummings – guitar

Production
 Live sound engineer: Stephen Wright

CD/LP Track listing
All tracks composed by Mogwai.

 "I'm Jim Morrison, I'm Dead" – 6:01
 "Friend of the Night" – 5:30
 "Hunted By a Freak" – 4:07
 "Mogwai Fear Satan" – 11:43
 "Cody" – 6:10
 "You Don't Know Jesus" – 5:31
 "I Know You Are But What Am I" – 4:04
 "I Love You, I'm Going to Blow Up Your School" – 7:57
 "2 Rights Make 1 Wrong" – 9:05
 "Like Herod" – 10:38
 "Glasgow Megasnake" – 3:50
 additional tracks on extended LP version and available through download
 "Yes! I Am a Long Way from Home" 5:48
 "Scotland's Shame" 6:30
 "New Paths to Helicon, Pt. 1" – 8:40
 "Batcat" – 5:47
 "Thank You Space Expert" – 7:06
 "The Precipice" – 7:03

Burning live DVD track listing
 "The Precipice"
 "I'm Jim Morrison, I'm Dead"
 "Hunted By A Freak"
 "Like Herod"
 "New Paths to Helicon, Pt. 1"
 "Mogwai Fear Satan"
 "Scotland's Shame"
 "Batcat"

References 

Mogwai live albums
2010 live albums
Instrumental albums
Rock Action Records live albums
Mogwai video albums
2010 video albums
Live video albums
Rock Action Records video albums